Diplogasterida was an order of nematodes. It was sometimes placed in a monotypic subclass Diplogasteria, but molecular phylogenetic evidence has shown it to be embedded in the family Rhabditidae (formerly Rhabditina). The confusion of having a hierarchical nesting of groups that were formerly mutually exclusive has led to a profusion of names. Although completely revised taxonomy of nematodes that builds on recent classification systems as well as recent phylogenetic evidence is still necessary, most contemporary taxonomic studies now treat all groups listed under "Diplogasterina" below as a single family, Diplogastridae.

Subdivisions
Suborder Chambersiellina Hodda 2007
Superfamily Chambersielloidea Thorne 1937
Family Chambersiellidae Thorne 1937 (Sanwal 1957)
Suborder Diplogasterina Paramonov 1952
Superfamily Cylindrocorporoidea T. Goodey 1939 
Family Cylindrocorporidae T. Goodey 1939
Family Odontopharyngidae Micoletzky 1922 
Superfamily Diplogasteroidea Micoletzky 1922 
Family Cephalobiidae Travassos & Kloss 1960a 
Family Diplogasteridae Micoletzky 1922  
Family Diplogasteroididae Paramonov 1952 
Family Neodiplogasteridae Paramonov 1952
Family Pseudodiplogasteroididae De Ley & Blaxter 2002
Family Tylopharyngidae Filipjev 1918 
Suborder Myolaimina Inglis 1983 
Superfamily Carabonematoidea Stammer & Wachek 1952 
Family Carabonematidae Stammer & Wachek 1952
Superfamily Myolaimoidea Goodey 1963 
Family Myolaimidae Goodey 1963

References 

  (2002): Nematoda. Version of 2002-JAN-01. Retrieved 2008-NOV-02.

Diplogasteria
Nematode orders
Rhabditidae